Michael Poppmeier (born 24 July 1982 in Durban) is a German international rugby union player, playing for the Villagers in South Africa and the German national rugby union team.

He returned to the German side against Georgia on 7 February 2009 after a five-year absence, having made his last international in 2004.

Poppmeier, born in South Africa, started playing rugby in 2000. He has played for Villagers, DRC Hannover, Rosslyn Park F.C., Lazio Rugby and San Gregorio Rugby so far.

Stats
Michael Poppmeier's personal statistics in club and international rugby:

National team

 As of 8 April 2012

References

External links
 Michael Poppmeier at scrum.com
   Michael Poppmeier at totalrugby.de

1982 births
Living people
DRC Hannover players
German rugby union players
South African people of German descent
Germany international rugby union players
Rugby union locks
Rugby union players from Durban
South African rugby union players
Villager FC players
Western Province (rugby union) players
Heidelberger RK players
Rosslyn Park F.C. players
South African expatriate rugby union players
German expatriate rugby union players
South African expatriate sportspeople in England
South African expatriate sportspeople in Italy
Expatriate rugby union players in England
Expatriate rugby union players in Italy